An integrated writing environment (IWE) is software that provides comprehensive writing and knowledge management functionality for writers and information workers. IWEs enable writers and information workers to perform a variety of tasks related to the document in the IWE in a single environment. This provides a distraction-free workspace and streamlined writing experience.

IWEs provide similar efficiency and functionality benefits to writers and information professionals that integrated development environments (IDEs) provide to software developers.

Overview 
IWEs are designed to maximize productivity and help improve the quality of written work by integrating together tools that allow users to work effectively in a single application. The IWE features may include integrated content search, reversion management, outlining, note management, and reference management, as may be suitable for the target field of use.

List of IWEs 
 Celtx  This IWE is intended for screenplay writers and has screenplay writing and management tools. Celtex provides tools for the pre-production work phase, story development, storyboarding, script breakdowns, production scheduling, and reports.

 Scrivener  This IWE targets novel, research paper, and script writing. Scrivener provides tools to organize notes and research documents for easy access and referencing. After completing the writing, Scrivener allows the user to export the document to formats supported by common word processors, such as Microsoft Word.

 TeXstudio  This IWE targets LaTeX documents and provides interactive spelling checker, code folding, and syntax highlighting.

References 

Application software